The 2009–10 Czech 1.liga season was the 17th season of the Czech 1.liga, the second level of ice hockey in the Czech Republic. 16 teams participated in the league, and KLH Chomutov won the championship.

Regular season

Pre-Playoffs 
 SK Horácká Slavia Třebíč – HC Vrchlabí 3:2 (4:2, 2:3 OT, 4:3, 0:1, 3:2 SO)
 HC Dukla Jihlava – HC Rebel Havlíčkův Brod 3:2 (3:2 OT, 2:3 SO, 3:2 SO, 2:4, 3:1)
 Orli Znojmo – HC Benátky nad Jizerou 3:1 (4:3 OT, 3:1, 2:3 OT, 6:4)
 SK Kadaň – HC Tábor 3:2 (4:2, 7:4, 1:3, 1:4, 5:2)

Playoffs

Quarterfinals

 KLH Chomutov – Orli Znojmo 10:1 (4:1, 4:0, 2:0)
 KLH Chomutov – Orli Znojmo 7:1 (2:0, 2:0, 3:1)
 Orli Znojmo – KLH Chomutov 5:7 (2:1, 2:3, 1:3)
 Orli Znojmo – KLH Chomutov 1:3 (1:0, 0:0, 0:3)
 HC Slovan Ústečtí Lvi – Sportovní klub Kadaň 3:1 (0:0, 1:1, 2:0)
 HC Slovan Ústečtí Lvi – Sportovní klub Kadaň 4:0 (1:0, 2:0, 1:0)
 Sportovní klub Kadaň – HC Slovan Ústečtí Lvi 6:8 (2:2, 3:3, 1:3)
 Sportovní klub Kadaň – HC Slovan Ústečtí Lvi 1:6 (0:3, 1:1, 0:2)
 HC VCES Hradec Králové – SK Horácká Slavia Třebíč 1:4 (0:0, 0:4, 1:0)
 HC VCES Hradec Králové – SK Horácká Slavia Třebíč 3:2 (2:2, 1:0, 0:0)
 SK Horácká Slavia Třebíč – HC VCES Hradec Králové 10:4 (5:2, 4:1, 1:1)
 SK Horácká Slavia Třebíč – HC VCES Hradec Králové 0:3 (0:1, 0:2, 0:0)
 HC VCES Hradec Králové – SK Horácká Slavia Třebíč 6:3 (2:0, 2:2, 2:1)
 SK Horácká Slavia Třebíč – HC VCES Hradec Králové 1:6 (0:2, 0:1, 1:3)
 HC Olomouc – HC Dukla Jihlava 3:0 (0:0, 2:0, 1:0)
 HC Olomouc – HC Dukla Jihlava 5:4(PP) (1:0, 1:2, 2:2 – 1:0)
 HC Dukla Jihlava – HC Olomouc 2:3(PP) (1:0, 1:2, 0:0 – 0:1)
 HC Dukla Jihlava – HC Olomouc 5:4 (2:1, 3:1, 0:2)
 HC Olomouc – HC Dukla Jihlava 4:3(PP) (1:0, 2:2, 0:1 – 1:0)

Semifinal

 KLH Chomutov – HC Olomouc 3:1 (1:0, 1:0, 1:1)
 KLH Chomutov – HC Olomouc 4:2 (2:1, 1:0, 1:1) 
 HC Olomouc – KLH Chomutov 3:4 SN (0:0, 0:2, 3:1)
 HC Olomouc – KLH Chomutov 2:1 (2:0, 0:0, 0:1)
 KLH Chomutov – HC Olomouc 3:0 (0:0, 1:0, 2:0)
 HC Slovan Ústečtí Lvi – HC VCES Hradec Králové 6:3 (2:0, 1:1, 3:2)
 HC Slovan Ústečtí Lvi – HC VCES Hradec Králové 9:1 (5:0, 4:0, 0:1)
 HC VCES Hradec Králové – HC Slovan Ústečtí Lvi 3:2 PP (0:0, 1:0, 1:2 – 1:0)
 HC VCES Hradec Králové – HC Slovan Ústečtí Lvi 6:1 (3:0, 1:0, 2:1)
 HC Slovan Ústečtí Lvi – HC VCES Hradec Králové 9:4 (2:1, 3:2, 4:1)
 HC VCES Hradec Králové – HC Slovan Ústečtí Lvi 1:5 (0:1, 1:3, 0:1)

Final

 HC Slovan Ústečtí Lvi – KLH Chomutov 2:1 (1:0, 1:1, 0:0)
 HC Slovan Ústečtí Lvi – KLH Chomutov 5:2 (2:0, 1:1, 2:1) 
 KLH Chomutov – HC Slovan Ústečtí Lvi 4:3 PP (2:2, 1:1, 0:0 – 1:0)
 KLH Chomutov – HC Slovan Ústečtí Lvi  5:2 (2:1, 3:0, 0:1)
 HC Slovan Ústečtí Lvi – KLH Chomutov 4:2 (0:0, 2:1, 2:1)
 KLH Chomutov – HC Slovan Ústečtí Lvi 6:2 1:1, 3:0, 2:1   
 HC Slovan Ústečtí Lvi – KLH Chomutov 1:2 1:1, 0:0, 0:1

Qualification round

External links
 Season on hockeyarchives.info

2009–10 in Czech ice hockey
Czech
Czech 1. Liga seasons